Mieke Docx (born 8 June 1996) is a Belgian professional racing cyclist, who currently rides for UCI Women's Continental Team .

References

External links

1996 births
Living people
Belgian female cyclists
Place of birth missing (living people)
21st-century Belgian women